World Armwrestling Championships is the main arm wrestling championship in the World. It is organized by the World Armwrestling Federation, founded in 1977. The first WAF World Armwrestling was hosted by John Miazdzyk in Wetaskiwin, Alberta, Canada in 1979.

Events
Medals are awarded separately for right and left hands in every weight class and age groups.
Age groups in 2019 included Sub-Junior (ages 14-15), Juniors (up to 18), Youth (21) Senior (adults), Masters (above 40), Grand Masters (above 50) and Senior Grand Masters (above 60). The Senior weight classes in 2019:

Championships

References

External links
 World Armwrestling Federation
 Canadian ArmWrestling Federation

Armwrestling
Arm wrestling competitions